Lefki is a village of the Elassona municipality. Before the 1997 local government reform it was part of the community of Stefanovouno. The 2011 census recorded 8 inhabitants in the village.

Population
According to the 2011 census, the population of the settlement of Stefanovouno was 8 people, a decrease of almost 67% compared to that of the previous census of 2001.

See also
 List of settlements in the Larissa regional unit

References

Populated places in Larissa (regional unit)